Chapuis is a French-language surname of the Arpitan region of eastern France and Francophone Switzerland with various spellings, and may refer to:

 Bernard Chapuis (born 1945), French writer
 Charles Bertin Gaston Chapuis de Tourville (1740–1809), French general
 Cyril Chapuis (born 1979), French footballer
 Félicien Chapuis (1824–1879), Belgian doctor and entomologist
 Jean-Frédéric Chapuis (born 1989), French skier
 Jean-Joseph Chapuis (1765–1864), French cabinetmaker
 Johann Chapuis (born 1975), French footballer
 Michel Chapuis (organist) (1930–2017), French organist
 Michel Chapuis (born 1941), French canoeist
 Olivier Chapuis (born 1975), French ice dancer
 René-Bernard Chapuy (1746–1809, known as Chapuis), French soldier and general
 Simone Chapuis-Bischof, (born 1931), Swiss women's rights activist

See also 
 Chappuis (disambiguation)
 Eustace Chapuys, Imperial ambassador to England from 1529 until 1545

French-language surnames